Golden West was an 1852 extreme clipper built by Paul Curtis. The ship had a very active career in the California trade, the guano trade, the coolie trade, the Far East, and Australia. She made a record passage between Japan and San Francisco in 1856.

Construction
Golden West had a long and sharp bow, with a gilded figurehead of an eagle.

Voyages
Golden West sailed under many different captains, making trips between New York, San Francisco, the Far East, Liverpool and Australia. An outline of her voyages is as follows:

Boston to San Francisco, Captain Samuel R. Curwen, 124 days, 1852.

San Francisco to the Chincha Islands, for a load of guano; arrived at Hampton Roads, January 20, 1854; 69 days from Callao.

Philadelphia to San Francisco, 145 days, 1854
Sailed with Golden State, which had left 4 days earlier, from the Horn to the equator.

San Francisco to Manila, 55 days
Manila to New York, 99 days, 1855
Struck a reef in Gaspar Strait; jettisoned 200 tons of hemp to get off it.

New York to San Francisco, Capt. Putnam, 175 days.
Sustained damage to rig off Cape Horn; spent 26 days in Valparaiso for repairs, 111 days out.
Valparaiso to San Francisco, 39 days—very fast run.

San Francisco to Hong Kong via Honolulu, 56 days.

Hong Kong to San Francisco, Capt. Folger, 47 days, 1856

Japan to Farallon Islands (off San Francisco), 4876 mi., 20 days. This was the record passage to date.

San Francisco to Hong Kong, Capt. Putnam, 62 days
Bangkok to Shanghai, with a cargo of rice, 1857
Shanghai to New York, 103 days, 79 days from Anyer, 1857

New York to Sydney, Capt. Curwen, Feb. 25-Aug. 8, 1858
Sydney to Hong Kong, 40 days, a fast time.
Hong Kong to San Francisco, 60 days
San Francisco to New York, Capt. Pinkham, 126 days, 1859
New York to London, Capt. McKenzie
London to Melbourne, 100 days

Trade in the Far East, under Capt. Lunt, until 1862
Shanghai to New York, Capt. Crandall, 101 days, 1863
New York to Liverpool, 1863

Sale of the ship
Golden West was sold at auction to British buyers in 1863. As of 1864, she was listed with a home port of Liverpool, owner J.G. Ross, Captain Jewett, master.

Coolie trade
In 1866 Golden West was in the coolie trade between China and Peru.

References

External links
The New Clipper Ship Golden West, of Boston, Boston Daily Atlas, Nov. 25, 1852
Golden West of Boston, Outward Bound, painting by William Bradford
Clipper Ship Golden West Entering New York, oil by Joseph B. Smith, Peabody Essex Museum

California clippers
Individual sailing vessels
Age of Sail merchant ships of the United States
Victorian-era merchant ships of the United Kingdom
Guano trade
Coolie trade
Ships built in Boston
1852 ships